Yvonne, princesse de Bourgogne is a 2009 opera by Philippe Boesmans to a libretto by Swiss dramatist and director Luc Bondy based on the anti-conformist play Iwona, księżniczka Burgunda by Witold Gombrowicz. Yvonne is the fourth in a series of operas with librettos by Luc Bondy, and the first of the four to be written in French not German.

Recordings
Dorte Lyssewski (Yvonne), Mireille Delunsch (Le Reine Marguerite), Paul Gay (Le Roi Ignace), Yann Beuron (Le Prince Philippe), Victor von Halem (Le Chambellan), Hannah Esther Minutillo (Isabelle), Jason Bridges (Cyrille), Jean-Luc Ballestra (Cyprien), Guillaume Antoine (Innocent), Marc Cossu-Leaonian (Valentin) Klangforum Wien, Sylvain Cambreling, Cypres. The recording was awarded Diapason d'or by the French music magazine Diapason.

See also
 Yvonne, Prinzessin von Burgund, opera in four acts by Boris Blacher

References

2009 operas
Operas by Philippe Boesmans
Operas
Operas based on plays
French-language operas